The canoeing competition at the 2018 Central American and Caribbean Games was held from 31 July to 2 August at Calima Lake, Colombia.

Medal summary

Men's events

Women's events

Medal table

References

External links
2018 Central American and Caribbean Games – Canoeing

2018 Central American and Caribbean Games events
Central American and Caribbean Games
2018